Claudio Humberto Huepe Minoletti (born 7 August 1966) is a Chilean politician who has served as the Minister of Energy since 11 March 2022.

References

External links
 BCN Profile

1966 births
Living people
Pontifical Catholic University of Chile alumni
Alumni of University College London
21st-century Chilean politicians
Social Convergence politicians
Ministers of Energy of Chile